"Water Under the Bridge" is a song co-written and recorded by American country music singer Sam Hunt. It was released June 23, 2022 as the second single to Hunt's upcoming third album.

Content

The song has a theme of nostalgia, which is compared to the metaphor of "water under the bridge". Lesley Janes of Nash News described the song as "laid back". After the song's release, Hunt released a music video featuring singer Kassi Ashton.

Personnel
According to AllMusic.

Musicians
 Tim Brasteid – percussion, background vocals
 Tyrone Carreker – percussion, background vocals
 Sam Hunt – vocals, acoustic guitar
 Chris LaCorte – electric guitar, background vocals, percussion, programming, synthesizer
 Josh Osborne – background vocals
 Sol Philcox-Littlefield – electric guitar
 Joshua Sales – percussion, background vocals
 Ilya Toshinsky – banjo, acoustic guitar, Dobro
 Alex Wright – Hammond organ, piano, synthesizer
 Craig Young – bass guitar
 Nir Z – drums, percussion

Technical
 Ryan Gore – mixing, recording
 Sam Hunt – producer
 Chris LaCorte – producer
 Kam Lutcherland – assistant engineer
 Alyson McAnally – production coordination
 Shane McAnally – producer
 Zaq Reynolds – mixing assistant

Charts

References

2022 singles
2022 songs
Sam Hunt songs
Songs written by Sam Hunt
Songs written by Shane McAnally
Songs written by Josh Osborne
Song recordings produced by Shane McAnally
MCA Nashville Records singles